Levi Sherwood (born 22 October 1991) is a freestyle motocross rider from New Zealand, nicknamed "rubber kid".

Early life
Sherwood was born in Palmerston North, New Zealand, attending Palmerston North Boys' High School. Starting out in motocross racing, he followed in the footsteps of his father Dave Sherwood, who was a professional speedway racer. Sherwood's love for speed and adrenaline translated into his move to freestyle motocross. He started riding motorbikes at the age of 4. At 12 years old he was invited to ride on the Crusty Demons Australasian tour, giving him a taste of professional freestyle.

Career

2009
In March, Sherwood was in the United States negotiating a sponsorship deal with Red Bull when a rider withdrew from the X-Fighters series, backed by the drinks company. He was offered the unexpected chance to fill in. At age 17, Sherwood competed in his first professional event and clinically beat the best riders in the world in front of 42,000, winning the opening round of the Red Bull X-Fighters in Mexico. He rode a KX450F, the only four-stroke that had ever been seen in at the huge competition. He qualified fourth and had arguably the hardest run to the finals. In the quarterfinals he beat Norwegian legend André Villa, then shocked the world when he closed out 2008 defending champion Mat Rebeaud in the semifinals. Sherwood then met Japan's Eigo Sato in the finals, but Sato was simply no match.

A starting place for the following Red Bull X-Fighters event in Canada followed. Despite not being able to repeat his debut win, Sherwood established himself as one of the top riders on the Red Bull X-Fighters World Tour 2009 with solid performances and including another podium finish, coming second in England.

2010
Sherwood won silver in the Moto X Freestyle final of the X Games XVI in Los Angeles. The field started with sixteen riders and carved back to the top four point scorers for three run final. Sherwood at the age of just 18 and the only New Zealander at the games, finished with 79 points from the best two scores of three rides, one point behind Travis Pastrana of the United States. Pastrana had locked up the gold before his final run when Sherwood was unable to catch up with his third round.

His sixth place in the overall standings in 2009 got him qualified for the 2010 season, and Sherwood was one of the five guys to battle for the title that year. Everything seemed to work in Sherwood's favor with a win in Moscow, and another victory in London, but then he crashed badly at the ASA World Championships of FMX in Pomona, California. He found himself with a dislocated wrist and badly broken femur. The injuries forced him out of the final battle in Italy and Sherwood watched the Red Bull X-Fighters World Tour finale on television.

Later that year it was confirmed that Sherwood, would ride alongside FMX legend Travis Pastrana and the entire Nitro Circus crew for their huge one night only show at North Harbour Stadium on February 5, 2011. Thus being Sherwood's first ever Nitro Circus Live performances.

Statistics

Red Bull X-Fighters World Tour

Nitro World Games

References

External links

Further reading 
 The 50 coolest Kiwis ever (+photos), in: The New Zealand Herald, 19 April 2014

Living people
1991 births
X Games athletes
New Zealand motocross riders
Freestyle motocross riders